Hambleton is a village and civil parish in Rutland, England. It is about two miles (3 km) east of Oakham.

Description 
The village's name means 'maimed hill'. It has been thought that the hill in the village looks as if it has been sliced off.

In 2001 Hambleton had a population of 140, increasing to 203 at the 2011 census. Since the construction of Rutland Water in the 1970s, the village has been closed off on three sides by water and the area is known as the Hambleton Peninsula.

The parish originally included the settlements of Upper Hambleton, Middle Hambleton and Nether Hambleton.  The latter two have now been almost completely submerged by the construction of Rutland Water (originally known as Empingham Reservoir). The Jacobean Old Hall in Middle Hambleton (built in 1611 and once the home of Sir Abel Barker, 1st Baronet) is now situated on the water's edge.

The village contains the 12th-century St Andrew's Church, Hambleton, a pub called The Finch's Arms and a hotel and restaurant, Hambleton Hall. The church, much enlarged over its history still has an original Norman south doorway and was extensively restored and fitted out during the late 19th century. This included excellent stained glass windows created mainly by James Egan during the last decade of the 19th century. Two of these were dedicated by the Reverend David Elliot Young to his mother and infant child who are buried in the churchyard. It is believed that the windows were funded by Walter Gore Marshall after being petitioned by Rev Young. Adjacent to the south side of the church yard stands a sixteenth-century priest house. The Hall was built in 1881 as a hunting box by Walter Marshall who left it to his sister, Eva Astley Paston Cooper. She was a socialite who gathered a salon including Noël Coward, Malcolm Sargent and Charles Scott-Moncrieff. Coward wrote Hay Fever while staying in the village.

There is a view across to Burley House from the north side of the village and from the south one can see across to the sailing club at Edith Weston on the far shore. The track around the peninsula along the lakeside takes walkers and cyclists through bluebell woods.

Hambleton was rated as among the "20 most beautiful villages in the UK and Ireland" by Condé Nast Traveler in 2020.

Abel Barker of Hambleton
Sir Abel Barker, 1st Baronet, of Hambleton (d. 1679) rented part of his lands from Edward Harington and James Harington, and farmed sheep on a large scale. Barker kept a letter-book, a copy of his and his family's letters. His sister Mary Barker wrote to the tailor John Swinfield in London to have a black gown made with a grass green or willow green petticoat and stomacher, and a warm winter woollen serge gown, and a scarlet serge riding coat and hood. She wanted Swinfeld's wife to buy some items for her including "cuffs of the neatest fashion." Barker's mother Elizabeth Burton tried to arrange a marriage for Abel with Anne Burton, daughter of Sir Thomas Burton, an old friend, who replied that the matter rested with his daughter. They married, and in 1647 she wrote to a London merchant Augustine Crofts for blue watchett sarsenet to make bed curtains and for powdered bezoar stone. Anne Burton also asked her sister Jane to shop for her and buy presents for her family including the "best fashioned gloves you can get." Abel Barker wrote to Elizabeth Goodman at Blaston, advising against marrying her deceased husband's half-brother which he believed to be uncanonical. After Anne died, in 1655 Barker tried to remarry with Mary Noell and with Rebekah Parsnett, who refused his offer. Mary Noell accepted, and in 1661 she wrote from Hambleton to her husband at the Dog and Ball on Fleet Street about the prevalent sickness of whooping cough and the risk to their children. Shortly before his death, Barker moved to a new house at Lyndon.

Gallery

References

External links

Rutland Website – Hambleton
Hambleton Village History
Hambleton Hall
Hambleton Church Website

Villages in Rutland
Civil parishes in Rutland